Liam Hickey (born March 25, 1998, in St. John's, Newfoundland and Labrador) is a Canadian Sledge Hockey player.

Career
After strong showings early in his career, he was offered an invite to join Team Canada's training camp for their National Sledge Hockey Team in Calgary, Alberta, where he played forward and was the lone person from Newfoundland invited. He was a member of the silver medal-winning Canadian team of para ice hockey at the 2018 Winter Paralympics. Hickey also competed for Canada at the 2015 Parapan American Games in wheelchair basketball as well as the 2016 Summer Paralympics. He was born without a femur in his right leg.

References

External links 
 
 

1998 births
Living people
Canadian men's wheelchair basketball players
Canadian sledge hockey players
Paralympic sledge hockey players of Canada
Paralympic silver medalists for Canada
Wheelchair basketball players at the 2016 Summer Paralympics
Para ice hockey players at the 2018 Winter Paralympics
Para ice hockey players at the 2022 Winter Paralympics
Medalists at the 2018 Winter Paralympics
Medalists at the 2022 Winter Paralympics
Sportspeople from St. John's, Newfoundland and Labrador
Paralympic medalists in sledge hockey